Arkhashan (also Romanized as Ārkhashān and Ārkhāshān) is a village in Avajiq-e Jonubi Rural District, Dashtaki District, Chaldoran County, West Azerbaijan Province, Iran. At the 2006 census, its population was 150, in 31 families.

References 

Populated places in Chaldoran County